Sarah-Ann Shaw is an American-born journalist and television reporter with WBZ-TV from 1969 to 2000. She is most prominently renowned as the first female African-American reporter to be televised in Boston. Shaw is also known for her presence in civil rights movements and as a volunteer in education programs. Her recognition is widespread, including awards from the National Association for the Advancement of Colored People (NAACP), Rosie's Place, the Museum of Afro-American History and Action for Boston Community Development (ABCD).

Early life and education
Shaw was born in the Roxbury neighborhood of Boston, to parents involved in the community. Sarah-Ann's father, Norris King Jr. was an active member in the Roxbury Democratic Club. Her mother, Annie Bell Bomar King, was involved in the distinguished civil rights activities of Melnea Cass.

During her years at William P. Boardman Elementary School and Henry Lee Higginson Elementary School, Shaw was active at St. Mark's Social Center. She completed her secondary studies at Boston Latin Academy (formerly known as Girl's Latin School) and was associated with the NAACP Youth Movement. After graduating in 1952, Shaw was admitted to Boston University where she studied briefly.

Career
In the early 1960s, Shaw joined the Boston Action Group in association with St. Mark's Social Center before being recruited to serve as director of the Boston Northern Student Movement. She led various projects centered on voter education and registration, in addition to supporting welfare programs in housing, rights and advocacy. Subsequently, she oversaw Boston's anti-poverty program, Neighborhood Operations for ABCD, as well as the Community Health Education Program at the Ecumenical Center.

In 1968 that Shaw made her first television appearance on Say Brother (now known as Basic Black), a public affairs broadcast by Ray Richardson. After numerous appearances on the show, she was hired by WBZ-TV as Boston's first female African American reporter in 1969. Shaw strived to oust prevalent racial stereotypes by featuring special reports that emphasized contributions made by minorities in Massachusetts.

Personal life
Shaw is married with three children, three grandchildren, and a great-grandchild. Her daughter, Klare E. Shaw, is a leader in the funding community for her contributions to non-profits in the Commonwealth's cultural community, and became the executive director of the Boston Globe Foundation in 1999.

Awards
Shaw has received several outstanding awards over the years:

 1998               National Association of Black Journalists' "Lifetime Achievement Award"
 2000               Emerson College RTNDA's (Radio Television News Direction Association) "Lifetime Achievement Award"
 2000               Society of Newspaper Editors' "Yankee Quill Award"
 2001               Boston Celtics' "'A Hero Among Us' Award"
 2002               The Woman of Courage's "Community Service Award"
 2002               Psi Omega Chapter of AKA Sorority's "Community Service Award"
 2003               Massachusetts Women's Political Caucus Abigail Adams Award
 2004               Pleasant Hill Baptist Church Community Legend Award
 2005               Harlem Book Fair-Roxbury's "Charles Yancey Literacy Award"
 2006               The Advent School Mona Hull Award for Education 
 2007               Teen Voices' "Intergenerational Activist Award"
 2007               Charles Hamilton Houston Institute and the City of Boston's "Local Hero Award"
 2007               Roxbury Community College's "Community Service Award"
 2008               Roxbury Action Program's "In Sight Award"
 2008               Broadcasters Hall of Fame induction
 2009               Roxbury Collaborative's "Unsung Hero Award"
 2014               Berklee City Music's "Unsung Heroes Award"

Shaw has also been presented with awards by the Black Educator's Alliance of Massachusetts, Boston Mayor Thomas Menino, The Boston Branch NAACP, The Boston Association of Black Journalists, The Irish Immigration Center, ABCD, Rosie's Place, the Cambridge YWCA and other groups and organizations.

Notes

Year of birth missing (living people)
Living people
American television reporters and correspondents
American civil rights activists
Boston University alumni
Boston Latin Academy alumni